Conrad Wayne Ricamora (born February 17, 1979) is an American actor. He is best known for his portrayal of Oliver Hampton on the ABC television series How to Get Away with Murder (2014–20). As a stage actor, he is noted for his roles in the original Off-Broadway musicals Here Lies Love and Soft Power, which premiered in 2013 and 2019, respectively. He made his Broadway debut in the 2015 revival of The King and I.

Early life
Ricamora was born in Santa Maria, California. He is the son of Ron Ricamora, who was in the US Air Force, and social worker Debbie Bolender. His father was born in Manila, Philippines and moved to the US when he was 10. His father is believed to be of Filipino descent and is adopted, and his mother is of German and Irish descent. Ricamora grew up primarily in Niceville, Florida, and was an avid tennis player. He is gay and was honored with the Human Rights Campaign's Visibility Award. 

Ricamora attended Queens University of Charlotte on a tennis scholarship, graduating with a degree in psychology in 2001. He graduated from the MFA acting program at University of Tennessee in 2012.

Career
Ricamora was first introduced to acting during his undergraduate studies and, after graduating, took part in community theater in Charlotte, North Carolina and Philadelphia before attending acting school. Following graduation, Ricamora performed the role of Ninoy Aquino in the 2013 Off-Broadway musical, Here Lies Love, which had two runs at The Public Theater. He won a Theatre World Award and was nominated for a Lucille Lortel Award for Outstanding Lead Actor in a Musical.

In 2014, he was cast in the recurring role of Oliver Hampton on the ABC legal drama series How to Get Away with Murder. He continued to make guest appearances throughout the show's second season and was promoted to a series regular in season three. The show concluded after its sixth season in 2020.

Ricamora played Lun Tha in Lincoln Center Theater's 2015 Broadway revival of Rodgers and Hammerstein's The King and I, directed by Bartlett Sher. The 2015 Broadway cast recording of the musical received a Grammy Award nomination for Best Musical Theater Album.

In 2017, Ricamora rejoined the cast of Here Lies Love as Ninoy Aquino at the Seattle Repertory Theater.

In 2018, Ricamora starred in the premiere of David Henry Hwang's Soft Power as Xue Xing at the Ahmanson Theatre in Los Angeles and subsequently received a nomination for the Grammy Award for Best Musical Theater Album.

Filmography

Film

Television

Theatre
Selected credits

See also
 Filipinos in the New York metropolitan area
 LGBT culture in New York City
 List of LGBT people from New York City

References

External links
 
 
 Conrad Ricamora at the Internet Off-Broadway Database
 Conrad Ricamora at About the Artists
 

1979 births
Living people
21st-century American male actors
American male actors of Filipino descent
American male stage actors
American male television actors
American people of German descent
American people of Irish descent
American gay actors
American LGBT people of Asian descent
LGBT people from California
Queens University of Charlotte alumni
Theatre World Award winners
University of Tennessee alumni
21st-century LGBT people